The Kolkata–Jogbani Express is an Express train belonging to Eastern Railway zone that runs between  and  in India. It is currently being operated with 13159/13160 train numbers on twice in a week basis.

Service

The 13159/Kolkata–Jogbani Express has an average speed of 38 km/hr and covers 547 km in 14h 20m. The 13160/Jogbani–Kolkata Express has an average speed of 43 km/hr and covers 547 km in 12h 45m.

Route and halts 

The important halts of the train are:

Coach composition

The train has standard ICF rakes with max speed of 110 kmph. The train consists of 20 coaches:

 2 AC II Tier cum AC III Tier
 2 AC III Tier
 8 Sleeper coaches
 6 General
 2 Seating cum Luggage Rake

Traction

Both trains are hauled by an Electric Loco Shed, Howrah-based WAP-4 from Kolkata till  after which a Diesel Loco Shed, Siliguri-based WDP-4 took charge for rest of the journey till Jogbani.

Direction reversal

The train reverses its direction 1 times:

Rake sharing

The trains shares its rake with

 13157/13158 Tirhut Express
 13155/13156 Mithilanchal Express
 13165/13166 Kolkata–Sitamarhi Express

See also 

 Kolkata railway station
 Kolkata–Sitamarhi Express
 Mithilanchal Express

Notes 

3 times in a week
Train runs

References

External links 

 13159/Kolkata–Jogbani Express
 13160/Jogbani–Kolkata Express

Transport in Kolkata
Express trains in India
Rail transport in West Bengal
Rail transport in Bihar